Amazons and Gladiators is a 2001 drama action adventure film directed and written by Zachary Weintraub and starring Patrick Bergin and Jennifer Rubin. The filming location was Vilnius. The film has many historical inaccuracies and was poorly received by critics.

Cast 
 Patrick Bergin as Crassus
 Jennifer Rubin as Ione
 Richard Norton as Lucius
 Nichole Hiltz as Serena
 Wendi Winburn as Gwyned
 Melanie Gutteridge as Briana
 Mary Tamm as Zenobia
 Janina Matiekonyte as B'Shara
 Darius Miniotas as Dance Master

References

External links 
 
 
 Amazons and Gladiators (2001)

2001 films
2000s action drama films
2000s adventure films
Australian action adventure films
Films set in ancient Rome
Films set in the Roman Empire
Films about gladiatorial combat
2001 drama films
2000s English-language films
2000s Australian films